Phidippus apacheanus is a species of jumping spider in the family Salticidae. It is found in the United States, Mexico, and Cuba.

Description 
It is large for a jumping spider, small males of this species measure 3.3mm and large female can measure up to 22mm. They are black with some orange, red or yellow coloration on top. The females usually have a black line on the abdomen. With the chelicarae being an iridescent green. It is thought they are mimics of the western velvet ant Dasymutilla flammifera or the Mutillidae family as a whole, both mimicking their coloration and their general shape.

Courtship display 
These spiders have an interesting courtship display, the males first holds his carapace high, shifting the abdomen to one side and raising the first pair of legs. In this position he advances in a zigzag, stoping every few steps, shifting his abdomen to the opposite side after each approach. While doing this the male flicks his pedipalps up and down, first holding them far apart, and slowly closing them together as he approaches the female. He then does this until the tips touch and form a circle. The female if she has accepted the male will do an acceptance dance, then the male cautiously touches the female.

The acceptance dance of the female involves her having the pedipalps high and far apart, with the abdomen to the side. The female then sways before the male, sometimes going side to side. After this dance the male climbs over the female, and uses the pedipalps to help her turn her abdomen. Then the male inserts his pedipalp to her genital pore.

Distribution 
This species has been observed in the United States, Mexico and Cuba, they are found in a great variety of habitats, such as grasslands, fields and deserts. Usually being found between 500 to 1800 m above sea level.

References

Further reading

External links

 

Salticidae
Articles created by Qbugbot
Spiders described in 1929